Khawaja Muhammad Qamar Ud Din Sialvi (1906–1981) known as Shaykh-ul-Islam was a Pakistani Islamic scholar, religious leader and politician. He was a Waliullah (Sufi saint) of the Chishti Sufi order; his Sufi convent (zawyah) is located in the village of Sial Sharif. 

He was also the founder of the Sunni Barelvi political party Jamiat Ulema-e-Pakistan (representing the Ulama of the Ahl-e-Sunnah Wa-al-Jamaa'ah denomination in Pakistan) and became its president in 1970. He is also credited for being one of the foremost and staunchest supporters of the movement for the creation of Pakistan.

Early life and education
Khwaja Qamaruddin Sialvi was born on 24 Jumada al-awwal 1324 A.H. (7 July 1906), in Sial Sharif in the Punjab Province of British India. He was the eldest son of Zia-ud-din Sialvi. He was familiar with the Quran by the age of nine. He received his religious education at several institutions, including ones in Mecca and Ajmer.

When his age was four years, four months and ten days, Khawaja Diya' al-Din enrolled him to memorise the Qur'an in the class of Hafiz Karim Bakhsh. He very quickly memorised the Qur'an in a short span of time. Following that, capable teachers taught him Persian and Arabic etymology and syntax with much joy and hardwork and this capable student accepted all that he was taught with much joy and enthusiasm. When he was very young and was reading the Kanz al-Daqa'iq, during this time he wrote a commentary on a difficult issue within the Kanz al-Daqa'iq in the Arabic language. After seeing it, great learned scholars were left amazed. This written piece caused a greater sense of enhancing the education and upbringing of this student in the heart of his father; Khawaja Diya' al-Din. As a result, he looked towards a distinguished scholar from the Khayr Abadi family of knowledge and wisdom, Maulana Mu'in al-Din Ajmayri. At that time, he was the principal teacher at Madrasa 'Uthmaniyya Dar al-Khayr in Ajmayr (India) and so for some time, Khawaja Diya' al-Din sent his beloved son to Ajmayr in pursuit of education. Later on, Maulana Ajmayri was brought from Ajmayr to Siyal and Khawaja Qamar al-Din continued acquiring knowledge from him. A student of Maulana Ajmayri, Maulana Muhammad Husayn, also began teaching in Siyal at Dar al-'Ulum Diya' Shams al-Islam. Khawaja Qamar al-Din studied philosophy and logic with one of the leading masters of the Khayarabadi tradition, Maulana Muhammad Din Budhwi, who was considered unparalleled in his age in the rational sciences as well as in many other subjects. Khawaja Qamar al-Din completed these various sciences and disciplines from these learned scholars. He also completed the Dawra Hadith with Maulana Ajmayri, who consequently bestowed the sanad and ijaza of hadith narration to him.

Muslim League

When Pakistan movement began for the independence of India, the Congress was at the forefront whose leadership was in the hands of some prejudiced and narrow-minded Hindus. However, the deceit of the main Hindu leaders had allured many Muslims to their tune and to raise their same voice. Many Muslim scholars, leaders and the learned had become devotees of Indian nationality and stood side by side with the Hindu leaders. At that moment Qa'id A'zam Muhammad 'Ali Jinnah demanded the formation of Pakistan. Khawaja Qamar al-Din – through his light of firasat – perceived the truth of Qa'id A'zam's position whilst great intellectuals of that time could not decide whether the claim of Qa'id A'zam had any acceptance or weight in it or not, or whether it is practicable or not. Khawaja Qamar al-Din, with firm resolve and certainty, announced his assistance and loyalty to Qa'id A'zam in the struggle to acquire Pakistan. History testifies that this man of truth, whatever step he took he did not stop until he reached his desired destination and objective.

The pursuing of a referendum in the Sarhad province  was much dangerous as the Khan Brothers had great influence and power here and they were blind devotees of Gandhi. The Red Shirts movement was accepted here to such an extent that in every town and village of the Sarhad province, red flags were waving. If in this referendum the Muslim League was defeated then the dream of Pakistan would have become dispersed and diminished before any interpretation could be given. The bravery of the people who paved the way for the success of the Muslim community in Sarhad, without a doubt at the front of this group, you would clearly see the shining face of Khawaja Qamar al-Din.

He became the president of the Sargodha branch of the Muslim League. He went to all corners of subcontinent to vote for the Muslim League in the election of 1946. He particularly walked along with Pir of Zakori in North-West Frontier Province to vote for the independence of Pakistan in the referendum of 1947. After the inception of Pakistan, he wrote to Quaid-e-Azam to congratulate him and emphasize the need for promulgation of Islamic laws. Replying his letter Quaid-e-Azam wrote "Efforts on part of Mashaikhs in the Pakistan Movement are highly commendable. Rest assured Islamic laws will be promulgated in Pakistan."

In the Indo-Pakistani War of 1965, Sialvi donated all the jewelry of his family to the Pakistan Army. In 1970 he became the president of Jamiat Ulema-i-Pakistan (JUP) and under his leadership party won seven seats in the National Assembly. Under his leadership, the party fared very well in the election of 1970. He was twice nominated as a member of the Islamic Ideology Council, where he worked hard to make the existing laws according to Islam.

Sialvi was awarded Tamgha-e-Imtiaz (Medal of Excellence), the fourth-highest award of Pakistan, by the President of Pakistan in 1981.

Death
He died of Syphilis on 20 July 1981 (17th Ramadan).  After his death Khawaja Muhammad Hameed Uddin Sialvi was appointed Sijjada Nasheen of Aaastana e Aalia Siaal Sharif by Peer Pathan Ghareeb Nawaz.

See also
Syed Faiz-ul Hassan Shah
Islam in India
Islam in Pakistan
Islam in Bangladesh
Islam in the United Kingdom

External link

 Anwar-e-Qamariya انوار قمریہ سوانح, A biography of Khwaja Qamar ul Din Sialvi, by Ghulam Ahmed Sialvi,

References

1906 births
1981 deaths
Pakistani politicians
Punjabi people
Pakistani religious leaders
Recipients of Tamgha-e-Imtiaz
People from Sial Sharif
Barelvis
Hashemite people
Alids
Awan
Alvis